The Young Woman's Journal was an official publication of the Church of Jesus Christ of Latter-day Saints (LDS Church) for the Young Ladies' Mutual Improvement Association (YLMIA), then the LDS Church's organization for adolescent females.

History and profile
The Young Woman's Journal was founded in 1889 by Susa Young Gates, a volunteer worker within the YLMIA, with its first issue dated October of that year. Anstis Elmina Shepard Taylor, the YLMIA general president at the time, oversaw the first publication of the journal. The periodical was unique for the time period, because of its target of a "young woman" audience.

Throughout its history, the periodical was edited by the general leadership board of the YLMIA under the direction of the organization's general presidency. It was published monthly until 1929, when the magazine was absorbed by the Improvement Era, an official publication of the YLMIA and the church's equivalent organization for male adolescents. The Improvement Era then served both organizations from that time forward.

The journal included messages from the MIA conferences, scriptural quotations, a plethora of short stories, recipes, meeting schedules, and pieces about morals, clothing, etc. Unlike current publications of the LDS Church, The Young Woman's Journal was subsidized by advertisements carried in the magazine.

Editors
 Susa Young Gates (1889–1901)
 May Booth Talmage (1901–02)
 Ann M. Cannon (1902–07)
 Mary Connelly Kimball (1907–23)
 Clarissa A. Beesley (1923–29)
 Elsie Talmage Brandley (1929)

See also

 New Era (magazine)
 List of Latter Day Saint periodicals
 Improvement Era

References

Bibliography

External links
Young Woman's Journal (PDF scans) courtesy of the L. Tom Perry Special Collections, Harold B. Lee Library, Brigham Young University.

1889 in Christianity
The Church of Jesus Christ of Latter-day Saints periodicals
Defunct women's magazines published in the United States
Magazines established in 1889
Magazines disestablished in 1929
Mass media in Salt Lake City
Religious works for children
Teen magazines
Young Women (organization)
Magazines published in Utah